Birthe Wolter (born 4 October 1981) is a German actress.

Career
She studied at the Munich's August Everding Music and Drama School  (2002–2006). Her most popular role so far was one of the leading role in the RTL series Schulmädchen. She also took part in the later ProSieben series Alles außer Sex with Simone Hanselmann, another school girl in Schulmädchen.

Besides her roles in television, she is also a famous movie and theatre actress.

Filmography / theatre

Series 
 1996: SK-Babies
 1999: Ein starkes Team
 1999: CityExpress
 1999–2002: Ein Fall für zwei
 2000: Nesthocker – Familie zu verschenken
 2000: 
 2000: Großstadtrevier
 2000: Mordkommission
 2001: Polizeiruf 110
 2005: Die Wache
 2004-2005: Schulmädchen
 2007: Alles außer Sex

Telefilms 
 1997: Kleine Einbrecher (main role)
 1998: Tatort – Bildersturm
 1999: Craniumfraktur (shortfilm in  London International Filmschool, main role)
 2000: Der Superbulle und die Halbstarken (supporting role)
 2001: Ich pfeif' auf schöne Männer (supporting role)
 2008: Tatort – In eigener Sache

Cinema 
 2000:  (supporting role)
 2002: FearDotCom (supporting role)
 2002: Letzte Bahn (main role)
 2003: Das Wunder von Bern (supporting role)
 2007: Virus Undead (main role)
 2008: Ganz nah bei Dir (main role)

Theatre 
 2004: Die Unbekannte aus der Seine (supporting role) Akademiebühne München
 2005: Hamlet oder nicht Hamlet, das ist hier die Frage (supporting role)Akademiebühne München
 2005: Der Golem (supporting role)Metropol Thetaer München
 2005 - 2006: Genua 01 (main role)Resident Theater München

External links 
 Agentur Gottschalk & Behrens
 
 Birthe Wolter in der deutschen IMDB
 Bayrisches Staatsschauspiel Theaterstück Genua 01
 Metropol Theater
http://www.metropoltheater.com/v960/

1981 births
German film actresses
Living people
Actors from Cologne
German television actresses
German stage actresses